ProVida is a series of mobile surveillance and speed limit enforcement systems produced by UK-based Petards Group. It was originally developed  in 1986 by Danish company JAI A/S. Its first user was Rigspolitiet Denmark, the Danish national police force. Today ProVida recordings are accepted as proof in various jurisdictions including the United Kingdom.

The latest iteration of the system, ProVida 4000, is available in more than ten languages. It consists of four components:

 ProVida Surveillance
 ProVida Speed Measurement
 ProVida Mobile ANPR
 Specialist Cameras

Details of the user interface 
 
There are several international variants for the "SPEED" counter on the camera:

 SPEED - United Kingdom, Poland, The Netherlands
 EGEN HASTIGHED - Denmark, Norway, Sweden - from the Danish word egen hastighed meaning "own speed"
 GESCHW - Germany - from the German word Geschwindigkeit meaning "speed", abbreviated to GESCHW.

Versions
Early versions had the following display:
PP SPEED
000.00 Mph

The other variants were:
PP SPEED
0.00 Mph
and from 1994 onwards
PP SPEED
0.00 m.p.h.
SPEED
000 m.p.h.

In 1996, a new version was launched, and this was in the format of
v: 0.00mph
o: 0mph

By 1997, the screen was in a new format of:
s: 0.00mph
o: 0mph

the "v" and "s" represent "vehicle" and "speed", literally.

Foreign versions of the above were:
h: 0.00km/t
o: 0km/t

where "h" is "egen hastighed", literally "own speed" in Danish.

External links
 Petards home page
 ProVida web page

Traffic enforcement systems